Susanna Parigi, born in Florence, is an Italian singer, songwriter, pianist and author.

Musical career
After earning her diploma in piano at the Cherubini Conservatory in Florence, she studied modern singing in Rome, opera in Bologna, and jazz in Milan.

Susanna Parigi's early songs were discovered by Vincenzo Micocci, that proposed her a contract with the IT label. Her debut track, 45 rpm "Un anello di fumo" (A smoke ring) gained her the first prize as singer in the La fabbrica dei sogni (The dream factory) TV show at RAI 3.

She toured as a pianist with Greg Brown and Riccardo Cocciante and as a vocalist and accordion player with Claudio Baglioni and with Raf for the album "Cannibali".

Her first album, Susanna Parigi, was released in 1995; in these songs the author began a personal path devoting herself to songwriting. Since the second album, Scomposta (1999), Susanna Parigi has been collaborating with Kaballà, a songwriters who shares her views.

The third album, In differenze, contains among others a song on Pat Metheny's music. Tony Levin, the Sofia Symphonic Orchestra, well-known Italian musicians, and philosopher Umberto Galimberti worked on the album, which carries as its cover a photo by Sebastião Salgado. It was presented in live shows at Colosseo, in Milan, Florence, Bologna. In December 2006 the show became a DVD with the cooperation of Médecins Sans Frontières.

A new album was released in 2009, titled L'insulto delle parole (The insult of words). A videoclip contains interviews with Italian writers and artists; the main theme is the way language is often mishandled by mass-media: new words for old facts, old words for new facts are, according to the author, an insult to people.

In 2000 her song "Tre passi indietro" received the first prize and the "Special Award best composition" at the "International Festival of Songwriting", held in Switzerland.

In 2003 Susanna Parigi was finalist at the "Festival della Canzone d'Autore" in Recanati.

Susanna Parigi currently teaches at the Bonporti Conservatory of Trento.

Discography

Albums 
 1995: Susanna Parigi (RTI Music)
 1999: Scomposta (Carisch)
 2004: In differenze (Sette Ottavi)
 2009: L'insulto delle parole (Promo Music)
 2011: La Lingua Segreta Delle Donne
 2014: Il Saltimbanco E La Luna
 2014: Apnea

Single
 1987: Un anello di fumo (IT EN 423)

Unpublished
 2001: Terra rossa (song with which she won the International Award "Myrta Gabardi")
 2002: Dal cielo invisibile scende in forma di suono la pena d'acqua (a song edited on New Age magazine N.115 May 2002)
 2006: La canzone dei vecchi amanti (with Kaballà, only available on DVD In differenze, a different versione from the album version L'insulto delle parole)
 2006: Qualcosa che ci sfugge (only available on DVD In differenze)
 2008: Silent Night (released in the album Dear Father Christmas, whose profits were used to give computer terminals to long-term care pediatric wards)

Poetry 
 2010: A poem of Susanna Parigi was published in the book Calpestare l'oblio. Poeti italiani contro la minaccia incostituzionale, per la resistenza della memoria repubblicana, Edizioni Marte, January 2010

Notes

External links 
 
 MySpace artist

1961 births
Living people
Italian women singers
Italian women pianists
Italian songwriters
Musicians from Florence
21st-century pianists
21st-century women pianists